Mesoderm induction early response protein 1 is a protein that in humans is encoded by the MIER1 gene.

Interactions 

MIER1 has been shown to interact with HDAC1.

References

Further reading